The 1991 British Formula Three season was the 41st British Formula Three Championship, won by Brazilian Rubens Barrichello. The season started on 17 March at Silverstone and ended on 13 October at Thruxton following sixteen races. The 1991 season is often considered a 'vintage' year for the series, producing two future Formula One Grand Prix winners in the form of Barrichello and David Coulthard as well as a future champions in CART (de Ferran), BTCC (Rydell) and WEC (Kristensen). It was also the last title win for Ralt chassis and the West Surrey Racing team. Class B was won by Finnish driver Pekka Herva.

Drivers and Teams
The following teams and drivers were competitors in the 1991 season. Class B is for older Formula Three cars.
{|
|

Source:

Race calendar and results
All races were held in United Kingdom.

Championship Standings

References

External links
 The official website of the British Formula 3 Championship

Formula Three
British Formula Three Championship seasons